Delphine is a 1931 French romantic comedy film directed by Roger Capellani and starring Henri Garat, Alice Cocéa and Jacques Louvigny.

It was shot at the Joinville Studios in Paris.

Cast
 Henri Garat as André Bernard  
 Alice Cocéa as Colette Bernard  
 Jacques Louvigny as Gaston Chavannes  
 Clara Tambour as Delphine Chavannes 
 Alexandre Dréan as Papillon  
 Antonio Brancato as Le ténor  
 Jean Granier as Le réceptionnaire 
 Henry Harment as Le directeur du theâtre 
 André Brévannes as Le valet de chambre

References

Bibliography 
 Crisp, Colin. Genre, Myth and Convention in the French Cinema, 1929-1939. Indiana University Press, 2002.

External links 
 

1931 films
1930s French-language films
Films directed by Roger Capellani
French romantic comedy films
1931 romantic comedy films
Films shot at Joinville Studios
French black-and-white films
1930s French films